Newell Brands is an American manufacturer, marketer and distributor of consumer and commercial products. The company's brands and products include Rubbermaid storage and trash containers; home organization and reusable container products; Contigo and Bubba water bottles; Coleman outdoor products; writing instruments (Berol, Expo Markers, PaperMate, Dymo, Mr. Sketch, Parker Pens, Sharpie, Reynolds, Prismacolor, Rotring, X-acto, Waterman) glue (Elmer's, Krazy Glue); children's products (Aprica, NUK, Tigex, Babysun, Baby Jogger and Graco); cookware and small appliances (Calphalon, Sunbeam, Rival, Crock-Pot; Holmes, FoodSaver, Oster, Osterizer, and Mr. Coffee) and fragrance products (Yankee Candle, Chesapeake Bay Candle, Millefiori Milano, and WoodWick).

The company's global headquarters was in Atlanta until tax incentives lured it to New Jersey in 2016. Three years later, in 2019, the company announced plans to relocate its headquarters back to Atlanta.

History

Newell Company 

The Newell Manufacturing Company was founded by Edgar Newell in Ogdensburg, New York, in 1903 as a manufacturer of metal curtain rods.

The F. W. Woolworth retail chain became the first customer for Newell's bronze–plated curtain rods in 1916, making them the first Newell products to be distributed nationally. This marked the beginning of Newell's mass merchandising strategy. As the business grew, the company built a new 15,000-square-foot facility in Ogdensburg, New York.

The company purchased Barnwell Mfg. Co. of Freeport, Illinois in 1921, renaming it Western Newell Manufacturing Company. Freeport's access to railroad lines facilitated shipping products west. Kresge, the department store chain (later Kmart) was one of Western Newell's larger accounts.

Daniel C. Ferguson was named president in 1965, and developed a growth-by-acquisition strategy, intending to build a strong, multi-product company.

The Newell Company went public in 1972, opening on the NASDAQ at $28 per share. In 1974, they acquired EZ Paintr Corporation, then the world's largest maker of paint applicators. Newell was listed on the New York Stock Exchange with the ticker symbol NWL in 1979. In 1979, Newell moved into its first corporate headquarters in a historic former bank building in Freeport, Illinois.

In 1983, the company entered the cookware market with the purchase of Mirro. In 1987, the company acquired Anchor Hocking Corporation, a specialty manufacturer of glassware, flatware, cookware and other products. The deal included the purchase of Amerock, a maker of cabinet hardware and window components.

In 1992, they acquired Sanford, a manufacturer and marketer of writing instruments, including the Sharpie and Expo brands. A year later, they acquired Levolor, a manufacturer and marketer of window treatments. They also entered the beauty and style category by acquiring Goody hair care accessories, including Ace men's grooming accessories.They also acquired Stuart Hall a Kansas City stationary company which they held until 1998

In 1997, the company acquired Kirsch, a company involved with drapery hardware and custom window coverings.  In 1998, the company expanded in cookware with the purchase of Calphalon Corporation, a manufacturer of cookware marketed primarily to upscale retailers and department stores. The company also purchased Panex, a cookware maker in South America.

In 2016, Newell moved its corporate headquarters to Hoboken, New Jersey.

Criticism
Newell Rubbermaid has been criticized in the UK for closing British factories, including those of Parker Pen, and relocating them to Nantes, France, and China. Similarly, they've been criticized for their handling of Toolmakers Berol, Record and Marples.

Newell Sistema products has been criticized for requiring workers in their Auckland, New Zealand factory to work in unsafe conditions during the COVID-19 outbreak and lock down without adequate distances between workers and proper personal protective equipment. After a WorkSafe NZ visit, workers were told they would not have to go to work and would be on full pay for the 4 week lock down.

Mergers

Rubbermaid 

In 1999, Newell acquired the Rubbermaid and Graco brand names in a megamerger worth $5.8 billion, and later renamed the combined firm Newell Rubbermaid. This was an acquisition ten times larger than the last biggest acquisition Newell had made, nearly doubled the company's size, and significantly increased Newell's portfolio of brands.

In 2003, the merger was dubbed the "merger from hell" by Businessweek magazine. Newell shareholders lost 50% of their value in the two years following the closing and Rubbermaid shareholders lost 35%. In 2002, Newell wrote off $500 million in goodwill.

Other mergers
In 2000, Newell Rubbermaid acquired Gillette's stationery products business, including the Paper Mate, Parker, Waterman and Liquid Paper brands.

In 2002, they acquired American Tool Companies, adding the Irwin, Vise-Grip, and Marathon brands to their portfolio.

In 2003, Newell Rubbermaid acquired American Saw and Manufacturing Company, a manufacturer of linear-edge power tool accessories, hand tools, and band saw blades marketed under the Lenox brand.

In 2005, the company acquired DYMO, designing, manufacturing, and marketing on-demand labeling solutions. The company expanded its presence in this market with the 2006 purchases of CardScan business card scanners and Mimio interactive whiteboard products along with the 2007 acquisition of postage company Endicia and its Picture-it-Postage brand. In 2005, Mark Ketchum was named president and CEO.  The company added the slogan of "Brands That Matter" to their logo to emphasize the change.

In February 2008, Newell Rubbermaid acquired Aprica Kassai, a Japanese maker of strollers, car seats, and other children's products and Technical Concepts, in the away-from-home restroom market. The company created a global headquarters in the Atlanta metropolitan area to consolidate numerous brands and functions under one roof. In July 2011, Michael B. Polk joined the company as president and CEO.

On July 21, 2014, Newell Rubbermaid announced a $308 million acquisition of Ignite Holdings, a Chicago-based maker of reusable water bottles and thermal mugs.  Ignite sold its products under two brand names: Avex and Contigo, also acquiring Ignite's proprietary closing mechanism, Autoseal.

On October 5, 2015, Newell Rubbermaid announced that it would acquire Elmer's Products, the makers of Elmer's glue, Krazy Glue, and X-Acto, among other brands, for $600 million. The company also announced plans to divest its window covering brands Levolor and Kirsch.

On December 14, 2015, Newell Rubbermaid announced that it would acquire Jarden for over $15 billion of cash and stock. The combined company would be known as Newell Brands, and 55% would be owned by Newell's shareholders. The combined company would have estimated annual sales of $16 billion.

Divestitures
In 2014 Newell Rubbermaid sold Ashland Hardware Systems, Bulldog and Shurline.

In 2017, Newell sold K2 Sports, Völkl, Diamond Match Company, Levolor and Kirsch.

In January 2018, Newell announced that it would sell off several businesses, mostly former Jarden units, in a refocusing effort. In May 2018, Newell sold Waddington to Novolex. In June 2018, Newell sold Rawlings to Seidler Equity Partners. In August 2018, Newell sold Goody to ACON Investments. In November 2018, Newell sold its Pure Fishing line of business to Sycamore Partners for $1.3 billion and Jostens to Platinum Equity for $1.3 billion.

In June 2019, Newell Brands announced the sale of the United States Playing Card Company to Belgian card manufacturer Cartamundi Group.

Brands
Newell's brands include the following.

Home Appliances 
 Calphalon
 Crock-Pot
 Mr. Coffee
 Oster
 Sunbeam 
 Cadence

Baby and Health
 Aprica Kassai
 Baby Jogger
 Graco
 NUK
 Century
 Tigex
 Lillo
 Billy Boy (condoms)

Connected Home & Security 
 First Alert
 BRK Electronics
 OneLink

Commercial Solutions 
 Quickie
 Rubbermaid Commercial Products
 Spontex
 MAPA

Food 
 Ball & Kerr 
 Food Saver
 Rubbermaid
 Sistema Plastics

Home Fragrance 
 Chesapeake Bay Candle
 WoodWick
 Yankee Candle
 Millefiori Milano

Outdoor & Recreation 

 Aerobed
 Avex
 Bubba
 Campingaz
 Coleman
 Contigo
 Esky
 Exofficio
 Invicta
 Mad Dog
 Marmot
 Sevylor
 Stearns

Writing (stationery) 

 Dymo
 Elmer's
 Liquid paper
 Mr. Sketch
 Paper Mate
 Parker
 Prismacolor
 Reynolds Pen
 Rotring
 Expo
 Sharpie
 Waterman pens
 X-Acto
 Berol

Former brands 

 Ashland Hardware
 Amerock
 Bulldog Hardware
 Bicycle 
 Diamond Match Company
 Goody 
 Irwin 
 Jostens
 K2
 Little Tikes 
 Marker
 Pure Fishing
 Rawlings
 Shurline
 Völkl
 Waddington
 Seal-a-Meal
 GrillMaster
 Health o Meter
 Margaritaville
 Rival
 VillaWare
 White Mountain Products
 Fiona
 Lillo
 Bernardin 
 Tableluxe
 Luma Home
 Calypso
 Crawford
 Lehigh
 Mucambo Professional
 Virulana
 Vitomit
 YOU
 Rexair
 Jarden
 Lifoam

Notes

References

External links

 

 
Conglomerate companies of the United States
Manufacturing companies based in New Jersey
Companies based in Hudson County, New Jersey
Hoboken, New Jersey
American companies established in 1903
Manufacturing companies established in 1903
1903 establishments in New York (state)
Companies listed on the Nasdaq
American brands
Home appliance manufacturers of the United States
Food manufacturers of the United States
Sporting goods manufacturers of the United States
1970s initial public offerings